The following is a list of notable companies in the petroleum industry that are engaged in petroleum exploration and production. The list is in alphabetical order by continent and then by country. This list does not include companies only involved in refining and marketing.

See also
 List of largest oil and gas companies by revenue
 List of oilfield service companies

References

Lists of energy companies
|
Oil exploration